

X-1B pilots

X-1B flights

See also
 Bell X-1
 Neil Armstrong
 John McKay

Flight lists